Love Everlasting may refer to:
 Love Everlasting (1913 film), a silent film directed by Mario Caserini
 Love Everlasting (2016 film), a film starring Lucky Blue Smith